|}

This is a list of results for the Legislative Council at the 1993 South Australian state election.

Continuing members 

The following MLCs were not up for re-election this year.

Election results

See also
 1993 South Australian state election
 Candidates of the 1993 South Australian state election
 Members of the South Australian Legislative Council, 1993–1997

References

1993
1993 elections in Australia
1990s in South Australia